Abashokobezi (1906–2006) is the third and so far final album by the South African music project Bambata, released in 2006, to commemorate the centennial of the Bambatha rebellion of 1906.

The title Abashokobezi refers to Zulu leaders who were involved in a Zulu civil war after the Zulu kingdom was divided into 13 chiefdoms whose chiefs were appointed by the British administration, in the wake of the Battle of Ulundi in 1879. The word abashokobezi (sing. umshokobezi) is derived from the name of an Usuthu war badge, ubushokobezi. The meaning of the word shifted from ‘adherents of the Usuthu faction’ to ‘rebels’ during the Zulu Civil War of 1879–84.

This album sees the Bambata music project move more to the direction of a band effort. The key figures on this album are Mzala Zuma, Philangezwi Bongani Nkwanyana, and the new addition to the ranks of Bambata musicians, vocalist Faca Kulu.

In anticipation of an Afro-World Sessions concert at Newtown Music Hall in Johannesburg, South Africa in 2004, Artslink of South Africa wrote about the album as follows:

The Swedish newspaper Svenska Dagbladet published a short review of this album in 2005:

Track listing

1. Voman’ emadlozini (re-arranged by Philangezwi Bongani Nkwanyana, Sipho Sithole)
 Performed by Philangezwi Bongani Nkwanyana, featuring Phindile Mkhize, King Prophet and Faca Kulu
 Keyboards: Sipho Ngwane
 Percussion: Tlale Makhene
2. Abashokobezi (A Tribute to Unsung Heroes 1906–2006) (Sipho Sithole)
 Performed by Faca Kulu and Philangezwi Bongani Nkwanyana
 Percussion: Tlale Makhene
3. Emanzini (A Tribute to the King) (Marvin Moses)
 Featuring Mangethe (Praise Poetry), Tlale Makehne (split voice),
 Trumpet: Mthandazeni Dumakude
 Izimpempe (whistles): Malambule
4. Ngicel’ amandla (Philangezwi Bongani Nkwanyana, Sipho Sithole, Jabu Khanyile)
 Performed by Philangezwi Bongani Nkwanyana, featuring Mzala
 Percussion: Tlale Makhene
5. Mbali (re-arranged by Mthandeni Mvelase, Henry B Kulu, Sipho Sithole, Jabu Khanyile)
 Performed by Faca Kulu
 Percussion: Tlale Makhene
6. Shomi yami (Maxhegwana Johannes Zuma)
 Performed by Mzala, featuring Philangezwi Bongani Nkwanyana and Faca Kulu
 Chorus by Philangezwi Bongani Nkwanyana and Faca Kulu
7. Ubhememe (Philangezwi Bongani Nkwanyana)
 Performed by Philangezwi Bongani Nkwanyana
 Percussion: Tlale Makhene
 Flute solo: Kelly Petlane
8. Ishixakaxaka (Maxhegwana Johannes Zuma, Sipho Sithole, Jabu Khanyile)
 Performed by Mzala, Faca Kulu and Philangezwi Bongani Nkwanyana
9. Ukufa kugehlule (Philangezwi Bongani Nkwanyana)
 Performed by Philangezwi Bongani Nkwanyana
 Flute solo: Kelly Petlane
10. Saphel’ isizwe (Henry B Kulu, Jabu Khanyile, Mthandeni Mvelase, Sipho Sithole)
 Performed by Faca Kulu and Philangezwi Bongani Nkwanyana
 Percussion: Tlale Makhene
 Trumpet solo: Madwe Nako 
11. Sishiman’ ushela kanjani (Sipho Sithole)
 Featuring praises by Tshat’ Ugodo, Faca Kulu, Mzala Zuma, Philangezwi Bongani Nkwanyana and Malambule
12. Mshana wami (Maxhegwana Johannes Zuma, Jabu Khanyile)
 Performed by Mzala Zuma, featuring Faca Kulu
13. Wena we zulu! Bayethe (Trad., arranged by Thembinkosi Zwane)
 Performed by Mangethe

Musicians
 Keyboards: Mthandeni Mvelase (except track 2)
 Bass: Fana Zulu
 Drums: Isaac ‘Mnca’ Mtshali
 Brass section (tracks 1, 2, 4, 5, 7, 10)
 Kelly Petlane (Soprano sax)
 Khaya Dlamini (Tenor sax)
 Madwe Nako (Trumpet)
 Izimpempe (whistles): Malambule (tracks 3, 4)
 Background vocals: Deborah Fraser, Khululiwe Sithole, Khanyo Maphumulo (tracks 2, 4, 5, 6, 7, 8, 10, 12)
 Extra vocals: Bongani, Faca, Malambule

Production credits
 Produced by: Malambule (all tracks), Jabu Khanyile (tracks 1, 2, 4, 5, 7, 10)
 Additional producing: Mthandeni Mvelase (preproduction, except tracks 2, 3); Marvin Moses (track 3), Nicky Blumenfeld (track 1)
 Assistant producers: Philangezwi Bongani Nkwanyana and Marvin Moses
 Executive producer: Malambule
 Engineer: Marvin Moses
 Extra Programming: Mthandeni Mvelase (except tracks 2, 3)
 Other Programming: Sipho Ngwane (track 2)
 Recorded and mixed at Downtown Studios (studio 2)
 Mixed at Downtown Studios by Dave Segal
 Sleeve design: Chevron Creative Consulting
 Project management: Native Rhythm Productions

References

Zulu music
Bambata (musical project) albums
2006 albums